Harald Schønfeldt (20 April 1896 – 23 October 1950) was a Norwegian footballer. He played in one match for the Norway national football team in 1919.

References

External links
 

1896 births
1950 deaths
Norwegian footballers
Norway international footballers
Place of birth missing
Association footballers not categorized by position